Eerie is a 2018 Filipino supernatural horror film written and directed by Mikhail Red. Starring Bea Alonzo and Charo Santos-Concio. The film which uses elements of suspense writing and follows a clairvoyant guidance counselor called Pat Consolacion (Alonzo). She embarks on solving the mysterious death of a student at the Catholic school, Sta. Lucia Academy for girls.

The film was produced by Star Cinema in partnership with 108 Media in Singapore. It was first released in Singapore as a premiere during the Singapore International Film Festival. The film was released in the Philippines on March 27, 2019.

Plot
The unexpected and gruesome death of a student threatens the existence of an old Catholic school for girls. Pat Consolacion is the school guidance counsellor who involves herself with the students to help them cope. She also helps uncover the mysteries of the student's death. Most students suspect it is the strict and borderline abusive Mother Alice. This is because she also threatened Pat's tenure in the school because of her continuous meddling with the case. But Pat's unusual talents lead her to know Eri, a former student who has been watching the whole school for years. Pat uncovers the secret of the school and the monster that it nurtured for the past century.

Cast

References

External links

2018 films
Filipino-language films
Star Cinema films
Gothic horror films
Religious horror films
Philippine horror films
Philippine ghost films
Films about suicide
Films about spirit possession
Fiction about murder
Films directed by Mikhail Red